The number of non-voting members also includes the non-voting member-elect from Puerto Rico, Pedro Pierluisi, who is a member of the New Progressive Party of Puerto Rico, but will caucus with the Democrats. The New Progressive Party is affiliated with both the Democratic and Republican Parties and the representative from Puerto Rico, Luis Fortuño, caucused with the Republicans. The vote total for the non-voting members also includes the Popular Democratic Party of Puerto Rico, which has ties to the Democratic Party.
Both non-voting independents, American Samoa's representative Eni Faleomavaega and the Northern Mariana Islands' representative-elect Gregorio Sablan, will caucus with the Democrats. In America Samoa all elections are non-partisan. In the Northern Mariana Islands, Sablan appeared on the ballot as an independent.
Write-in candidates are included with the vote totals.
Ohio's 11th congressional district was previously Democratic before being vacant. The Democratic Party regained control after this election. A special election to fill the seat for the remainder of the 110th Congress was held on November 15, 2008.References